Chaudhry Ghulam Murtaza  is a Pakistani politician who was a Member of the Provincial Assembly of the Punjab, from November 2002 to November 2007 and again from May 2013 to May 2018.

Early life and education
He was born on 6 March 1977 in Bahawalnagar.

He graduated in Bachelor of Commerce in 2000 from Punjab College of Commerce, Lahore.

Political career
He was elected to the Provincial Assembly of the Punjab as a candidate of Pakistan Muslim League (Z) (PML-Z) from Constituency PP-283 (Bahawalnagar-VII) in 2002 Pakistani general election. He received 35,015 votes and defeated Irfan Shaukat, a candidate of Pakistan Muslim League (Q) (PML-Q).

He ran for the seat of the Provincial Assembly of the Punjab as a candidate of PML-Q from Constituency PP-283 (Bahawalnagar-VII) in 2008 Pakistani general election but was unsuccessful. He received 38,279 votes and lost the seat to Shaukat Mahmood Basra, a candidate of Pakistan Peoples Party (PPP).

He was re-elected to the Provincial Assembly of the Punjab as a candidate of PML-Z from Constituency PP-283 (Bahawalnagar-VII) in 2013 Pakistani general election. He received 43,337 votes and defeated Ashraf Ul Islam, a candidate of Pakistan Muslim League (N) (PML-N).

References

Living people
Punjab MPAs 2013–2018
1977 births
Punjab MPAs 2002–2007
Pakistan Muslim League (Z) politicians